The 9th Wisconsin Infantry Regiment was a volunteer infantry regiment that served in the Union Army during the American Civil War.

Service
The 9th Wisconsin Infantry Regiment was raised at Milwaukee, Wisconsin, and mustered into Federal service October 26, 1861. It consisted predominantly of recent immigrants from German-speaking countries.

The 9th Wisconsin was first ordered to Leavenworth, Kansas, on 22 January 1862. It participated in an expedition into Indian Territory (present-day Oklahoma) in summer 1862. Afterwards, the regiment operated in Missouri and Arkansas, where it took part in: the First Battle of Newtonia, Arkansas, on September 30, 1862; the Battle of Prairie Grove, Arkansas, December 7, 1862; and the Battle of Jenkins' Ferry, Arkansas, on April 30, 1864.

The 9th Wisconsin's commander and most of the regiment's personnel mustered out on December 3, 1864, upon expiration of their term of service.  The remaining personnel were reorganized into a four-company independent battalion that remained in service in Arkansas until mustered out on January 30, 1866.

Total enlistments and casualties
The 9th Wisconsin initially mustered 916 men and later recruited an additional 105 men, for a total of 1,021 men.
The regiment lost 77 enlisted men killed in action or who later died of their wounds, plus another 114 enlisted men who died of disease, for a total of 191 fatalities.

Commanders
 Colonel Frederick Salomon (August 22, 1861July 16, 1862) was promoted to brigadier general.  After the war he received an honorary brevet to major general.  He was the brother of Wisconsin's war-time Governor Edward Salomon.
 Colonel Charles Eberhard Salomon (August 25, 1862December 3, 1864) mustered out at the end of his three years service.  Earlier in the war, he had served as colonel of the 5th Missouri Infantry Regiment.  After the war he received an honorary brevet to brigadier general. He was also a brother of Edward Salomon.
 Lt. Colonel Arthur Jacobi (December 3, 1864August 1865) commanded the independent battalion until he was detached as provost marshal at Little Rock.
 Captain George Eckhart (August 1865January 1866) commanded the independent battalion and mustered out with them.

Notable people
 John Fetzer was enlisted in Co. B and wounded at Jenkins' Ferry.  He received an honorary brevet to captain in 1864.  After the war he became a Wisconsin state senator.
 Reinhard Schlichting was enlisted in Co. K and promoted to 2nd lieutenant in 1864.  He was subsequently commissioned captain of Co. A in the 45th Wisconsin Infantry Regiment.  After the war he became a Wisconsin state senator and district attorney.
 Carl Schmidt was 1st lieutenant of Co. G and was promoted to captain of Co. F.  He also served as acting quartermaster during 1864.  After the war he became a Wisconsin state senator.
 John J. Senn was enlisted in Co. H and transferred to Co. D after the regiment was reorganized.  After the war he became a Wisconsin state legislator.

See also

 List of Wisconsin Civil War units
 Wisconsin in the American Civil War

References

External links
 9th Wisconsin Infantry History at the Wisconsin Historical Society
 The Civil War Archive
 Wisconsin's Salomon Brothers in the Civil War
 Civil War diary of Michael Zimmer

Military units and formations established in 1861
Military units and formations disestablished in 1866
Units and formations of the Union Army from Wisconsin
Military units and formations disestablished in 1865
1861 establishments in Wisconsin
1866 disestablishments in Wisconsin